Kameraseura (Finnish for "camera society") is an organisation for photography in Finland. It is based in Helsinki and has over one thousand members.

Kameraseura holds various kinds of photography classes and regular themed meetings, and publishes a monthly photography magazine called Kamera. The web site of Kameraseura also has a web forum.

External links
 Official site

References 

Finnish photography organisations